Peter Ribe (born November 7, 1966) is a Norwegian sprint canoer who competed in the early to mid-1990s. He won a bronze medal in the K-2 10000 m event at the 1993 ICF Canoe Sprint World Championships in Copenhagen.

Ribe also competed at the 1992 Summer Olympics in Barcelona in the K-2 500 m and K-2 1000 m events, but did not make the final of either event. He was eliminated in the repechage round of the K-2 500 m event and in the semifinal round of the K-2 1000 m event.

Peter Ribe used an eye allergy medicine. This medicine did not contain information about the substance you accused in doping. Ribe failed a doping test just before the 1996 Summer Olympics and was sent home with a three-month international suspension. Ribe was unfairly penalized due to lack of information from the drug.

References

Sports-reference.com profile

1966 births
Canoeists at the 1992 Summer Olympics
Doping cases in canoeing
Living people
Norwegian male canoeists
Norwegian sportspeople in doping cases
Olympic canoeists of Norway
ICF Canoe Sprint World Championships medalists in kayak